Patterns of Force may refer to:

 "Patterns of Force" (Star Trek: The Original Series), an episode of Star Trek: The Original Series
 Patterns of Force (novel), a Star Wars novel